Most Girls may refer to:
"Most Girls" (Pink song), 2000
"Most Girls" (Hailee Steinfeld song), 2017